The Bank of New York Mellon Corporation, commonly known as BNY Mellon, is an American investment banking services holding company headquartered in New York City. BNY Mellon was formed from the merger of The Bank of New York and the Mellon Financial Corporation in 2007. It is the world's largest custodian bank and securities services company, with $1.8trillion in assets under management and $44.3trillion in assets under custody at the end of 2022 fiscal. It is considered a systemically important bank by the Financial Stability Board. BNY Mellon is incorporated in Delaware.

Through its Bank of New York predecessor, it is one of the three oldest banking corporations in the United States and among the oldest banks in the world, having been established in June 1784 by a group that included American Founding Father Alexander Hamilton. T. Mellon and Sons Bank, was founded in Pittsburgh in 1869 by Thomas Mellon and his sons Richard and Andrew, the latter of whom later became Secretary of the US Treasury.

History

Bank of New York

The first bank in the U.S. was the Bank of North America in Philadelphia, which was chartered by the Continental Congress in 1781; Alexander Hamilton, Thomas Jefferson and Benjamin Franklin were among its founding shareholders. In February 1784, The Massachusetts Bank in Boston was chartered.

The shipping industry in New York City chafed under the lack of a bank, and investors envied the 14% dividends that Bank of North America paid, and months of local discussion culminated in a June 1784 meeting at a coffee house on St. George's Square which led to the formation of the Bank of New York company; it operated without a charter for seven years. The initial plan was to capitalize the company with $750,000, a third in cash and the rest in mortgages, but after this was disputed the first offering was to capitalize it with $500,000 in gold or silver. When the bank opened on June 9, 1784, the full $500,000 had not been raised; 723 shares had been sold, held by 192 people. Aaron Burr had three of them, and Hamilton had one and a half shares. The first president was Alexander McDougall and the Cashier was William Seton.

Its first offices were in the old Walton Mansion in New York City. In 1787, it moved to a site on Hanover Square that the New York Cotton Exchange later moved into.

The bank provided the United States government its first loan in 1789. The loan was orchestrated by Hamilton, then Secretary of the Treasury, and it paid the salaries of United States Congress members and President George Washington.

The Bank of New York was the first company to be traded on the New York Stock Exchange when it first opened in 1792. In 1796, the bank moved to a location at the corner of Wall Street and William Street, which would later become 48 Wall Street.

The bank had a monopoly on banking services in the city until the Bank of the Manhattan Company was founded by Aaron Burr in 1799; the Bank of New York and Hamilton vigorously opposed its founding.

During the 19th century, the bank was known for its conservative lending practices that allowed it to weather financial crises. It was involved in the funding of the Morris and Erie canals, and steamboat companies. The bank helped finance both the War of 1812 and the Union Army during the American Civil War. Following the Civil War, the bank loaned money to many major infrastructure projects, including utilities, railroads, and the New York City Subway.

Through the early 20th century, the Bank of New York continued to expand and prosper. In July 1922, the bank merged with the New York Life Insurance and Trust Company. The bank continued to profit and pay dividends throughout the Great Depression, and its total deposits increased during the decade. In 1948, the bank again merged, this time with the Fifth Avenue Bank, which was followed by a merger in 1966 with the Empire Trust Company. The bank's holding company was created in 1969.

In 1988, the Bank of New York merged with Irving Bank Corporation after a year-long hostile take over bid by Bank of New York. Irving had been headquartered at 1 Wall Street and after the merger, this became the headquarters of the Bank of New York on July 20, 1998. In 1922, Irving Trust opened an account with Vnesheconombank, now known as VEB, and beginning on October 7, 1988, when the merger was approved, the Bank of New York was able to conduct transactions with the Soviet Union and later in 1991 Russia. Natasha Kagalovsky (née Gurfinkel) with the pseudonym Gurova, who had been an employee at Irving Trust since 1986 and was in charge of the banking with the Soviet Union, became a senior vice president at the Bank of New York heading the Eastern European operations from 1992 until October 13, 1999, when she resigned.

From 1993 to 1998, the bank made 33 acquisitions, including acquiring JP Morgan's Global Custody Business in 1995. Ivy Asset Management was acquired in 2000, and the bank acquired Pershing LLC, the United States' second-largest trade clearinghouse, in 2003.

In the 1990s,  or "Mickey" Galitzine (1942-2018, born Belgrade) with the pseudonym Vladimirov, whose father was a director of the Tolstoy Foundation, established and headed the Eastern European Department at the Bank of New York until 1992 and hired many Russians. He mentored many new bankers in Hungary, the former East Germany, Poland, Romania, and Bulgaria and travelled extensively to capital cities in the former Soviet Union or the CIS to assist new bankers especially in Russia to where he travelled for his first time in 1990, Ukraine, Latvia, Georgia, Armenia, Turkmenistan, and Kazakhstan. In 1960, he joined the Bank of New York and worked as an accountant in its International Department but later headed the Russia team as a vice president of the bank. His wife Tatiana Vladimirovna Kazimirova (b. 1943, Berlin), an employee at the Bank of New York whom he married in 1963, worked very closely with him. He traveled for his first time to Russia in 1990. He worked closely with banks in Greece, Malta, and Italy and was an expert in cotton, gold, silver, and other raw materials financing.

In 2005, the bank settled a US federal investigation that began in 1996 concerning money laundering related to post-Soviet privatization in Russia. The illegal operation involved two Russian emigres, Peter Berlin and his wife Lyudmila "Lucy" (née Pritzker) Edwards who was a Vice President of the bank and worked at its London office, moving over US$7 billion via hundreds of wires. Through accounts created by Peter Berlin for Alexei Volkov's Torfinex Corportion, Bees Lowland, which was an offshore shell company created by Peter Berlin, and Benex International Company Inc, numerous irregular wire transfers occurred at the Bank of New York. In October 1997 at Bologna, Joseph Roisis, also spelled Yosif Aronovizh Roizis and nicknamed Cannibal as a member of Russian mafia's Solntsevskaya Bratva with businesses in Czechoslovakia, explained to Italian prosecutors that 90% of the money flowing through Benex accounts at the Bank of New York is Russian mafia money. Alexei Volkov was charged in the United States but fled to Russia which has no extradition treaty with the United States and later the charges were dropped. Svetlana Kudryavtsev, a Bank of New York employee that was responsible for the proper operation of the Benex accounts in New York which had ties to Semion Mogilevich and through which passed $4.2 billion from October 1998 to March 1999, refused to cooperate and resigned during an internal audit of the matter but was later indicted by the FBI for her role in which she received $500 a month from Edwards for her services. Alexander Mamut's Sobinbank, which since August 2010 is a subsidiary of Rossiya Bank, was raided on October 10, 1999, in support of United States investigations into money laundering at the Bank of New York. The Vanuatu registered Sobinbank Limited facilitated transfers between December 1997 and February 1999 for Benex accounts. Edmond Safra of the bank Republic New York, which is a longtime rival of the Bank of New York, alerted the FBI to the money laundering scheme which also involved Russian banks including Sobinbank and the Depozitarno-Kliringovy Bank (DKB) or the Russian Deposit Clearinghouse Bank which was created by Peter Berlin and had the same address as the Bees Lowland offshore shell company. $3 billion went from both Russian DKB and Sobinbank accounts through the Igor and Oleg Berezovsky owned Italian firm Prima based in Rimini and, through Andrei Marisov at the Grigory Luchansky associated French firm Kama Trade which had accounts with the Société bancaire arabe (SBA) to accounts at the Peter Berlin created Sinex Bank in Nauru.

In 2006, the Bank of New York traded its retail banking and regional middle-market businesses for J.P. Morgan Chase's corporate trust assets. The deal signaled the bank's exit from retail banking.

Mellon Financial

Mellon Financial was founded as T. Mellon & Sons' Bank in Pittsburgh, Pennsylvania, in 1869 by retired judge Thomas Mellon and his sons Andrew W. Mellon and Richard B. Mellon. The bank invested in and helped found numerous industrial firms in the late 1800s and early 1900s including Alcoa, Westinghouse, Gulf Oil, General Motors and Bethlehem Steel. Both Gulf Oil and Alcoa are, according to the financial media, considered to be T. Mellon & Sons' most successful financial investments.

In 1902, T. Mellon & Sons' name was changed to the Mellon National Bank. The firm merged with the Union Trust Company, a business founded by Andrew Mellon, in 1946. The newly formed organization resulting from the merger was named the Mellon National Bank and Trust Company, and was Pittsburgh's first US$1 billion bank.

The bank formed the first dedicated family office in the United States in 1971. A reorganization in 1972 led to the bank's name changing to Mellon Bank, N.A. and the formation of a holding company, Mellon National Corporation.

Mellon Bank acquired multiple banks and financial institutions in Pennsylvania during the 1980s and 1990s. In 1992, Mellon acquired 54 branch offices of Philadelphia Savings Fund Society, the first savings bank in the United States, founded in 1819.

In 1993, Mellon acquired The Boston Company from American Express and AFCO Credit Corporation from The Continental Corporation. The following year, Mellon merged with the Dreyfus Corporation, bringing its mutual funds under its umbrella. In 1999, Mellon Bank Corporation became Mellon Financial Corporation. Two years later, it exited the retail banking business by selling its assets and retail bank branches to Citizens Financial Group.

Merger
On December 4, 2006, the Bank of New York and Mellon Financial Corporation announced they would merge. The merger created the world's largest securities servicing company and one of the largest asset management firms by combining Mellon's wealth-management business and the Bank of New York's asset-servicing and short-term-lending specialties. The companies anticipated saving about $700 million in costs and cutting around 3,900 jobs, mostly by attrition.

The deal was valued at $16.5 billion and under its terms, the Bank of New York's shareholders received 0.9434 shares in the new company for each share of the Bank of New York that they owned, while Mellon Financial shareholders received 1 share in the new company for each Mellon share they owned. The Bank of New York and Mellon Financial entered into mutual stock option agreements for 19.9 percent of the issuer's outstanding common stock. The merger was finalized on July 1, 2007. The company's principal office of business at the One Wall Street office previously held by the Bank of New York. The full name of the company became The Bank of New York Mellon Corp., with the BNY Mellon brand name being used for most lines of business.

Post-merger history
In October 2008, the U.S. Treasury named BNY Mellon the master custodian of the Troubled Asset Relief Program (TARP) bailout fund during the financial crisis of 2007 to 2010. BNY Mellon won the assignment, which included handling accounting and record-keeping for the program, through a bidding process. In November 2008, the company announced that it would lay-off 1,800 employees, or 4 percent of its global workforce, due to the financial crisis. According to the results of a February 2009 stress test conducted by federal regulators, BNY Mellon was one of only three banks that could withstand a worsening economic situation. The company received $3 billion from TARP, which it paid back in full in June 2009, along with US$136 million to buy back warrants from the Treasury in August 2009.

In August 2009, BNY Mellon purchased Insight Investment, a management business for external funds, from Lloyds Banking Group. The company acquired PNC Financial Services' Global Investment Servicing Inc. in July 2010 and Talon Asset Management's wealth management business in 2011.

By 2013, the company's capital had steadily risen from the financial crisis. In the results of the Federal Reserve's Dodd-Frank stress test in 2013, the bank was least affected by hypothetical extreme economic scenarios among banks tested. It was also a top performer on the same test in 2014.

BNY Mellon began a marketing campaign in 2013 to increase awareness of the company that included a new slogan and logo.

In 2013, the bank started building a new IT system called NEXEN. NEXEN uses open source technology and includes components such as an API store, data analytics, and a cloud computing environment.

In May 2014, BNY Mellon sold its 1 Wall Street headquarters, and in 2015, moved into leased space at Brookfield Place. In June 2014, the company combined its global markets, global collateral services and prime services to create the new Markets Group, also known as BNY Markets Mellon. The company expanded its Hong Kong office in October 2014 as part of the company's plans to grow its wealth management business.

Between 2014 and 2016, BNY Mellon opened innovation centers focused on emerging technologies, big data, digital and cloud-based projects, with the first opening in Silicon Valley.

In September 2017, BNY Mellon announced that it agreed to sell CenterSquare Investment Management to its management team and the private equity firm Lovell Minnick Partners. The transaction is subject to standard regulatory approvals and is expected to be completed by the end of 2017.

In January 2018, BNY Mellon announced that it was again moving its headquarters location, less than four years after its prior move. The headquarters location was announced as 240 Greenwich Street, a renaming of the already BNY Mellon-owned 101 Barclay Street office building in Tribeca, New York City. BNY Mellon had owned the office building for over 30 years, with control of the location obtained via 99-year ground lease. The same year, the company purchased the location from the city for $352 million.

Historical data
The following graphs represent the net income and assets and liabilities for the years 2000 to 2016 for the Bank of New York Mellon, the Bank of New York Mellon Corporation's New York state-chartered bank and an FDIC-insured depository institution.

Operations
BNY Mellon operates in 35 countries in the Americas, Europe, the Middle East and Africa (EMEA), and Asia-Pacific. The company employed 51,700 people . In October 2015, the group's American and global headquarters relocated to 225 Liberty Street, as the former 1 Wall Street building was sold in 2014. In July 2018, the company changed its headquarters again, this time to its existing 240 Greenwich Street location in New York (previously addressed 101 Barclay St). The group's EMEA headquarters are located in London and its Asia-Pacific headquarters are located in Hong Kong.

Business
The bank's primary functions are managing and servicing the investments of institutions and high-net-worth individuals. Its two primary businesses are Investment Services and Investment Management. The bank's clients include 80 percent of Fortune 500 companies. The company also serves 77 percent of the top 100 endowments, 87 percent of the top 1,000 pension and employee benefit funds, 51 percent of the top 200 life and health insurance companies and 50 percent of the top 50 universities.

Investment Services
The bank's Investment Services business represents approximately 72 percent of the company's revenue and it has $31.1 trillion under its custody or administration as of September 2016. The financial services offered by the business include asset servicing, alternative investment services, broker-dealer services, corporate trust services and treasury services. Other offerings include global collateral services, foreign exchange, securities lending, middle and back office outsourcing, and depository receipts.

The company's subsidiary Pershing LLC handles securities services, including execution, settlement, and clearing. It also provides back office support to financial advisors.

In 2014, the company formed a new Markets Group, which offers collateral management, securities finance, foreign exchange and capital markets. The group is now known as BNY Mellon Markets.

Investment Management

Wealth Management
BNY Mellon's Wealth Management unit handles the private banking, estate planning, family office services, and investment servicing and management of high-net-worth individuals and families. As of 2014, it ranks 7th among wealth management businesses in the United States. Starting in 2013, the unit began expansion efforts, including opening eight new banking offices, increasing salespeople, bankers, and portfolio managers on staff, and launching an awareness campaign for wealth management services through television ads.

Leadership
Charles W. Scharf was appointed CEO in July 2017 and became Chairman after former CEO and Chairman Gerald Hassell retired at the end of 2017. Hassell had been Chairman and CEO since 2011, after serving as BNY Mellon's president from 2007 to 2012 and as the president of the Bank of New York from 1998 until its merger. Scharf stepped down in 2019 to become the new CEO of Wells Fargo. Thomas "Todd" Gibbons served as BNY Mellon's CEO from 2020 to 2022. Robin Vince took over as the new CEO in 2022.

Karen Peetz served as president (the bank's first female president) from 2013 to 2016, when she retired; the company did not appoint a new president when she retired. Thomas Gibbons served as CFO between 2008 and 2017, when he also served as vice chairman. In 2017, Gibbons was replaced as CFO by Michael P. Santomassimo. BNY Mellon's Investment Management business is run by CEO Mitchell Harris, and the company's Investment Services business was led by Brian Shea until his retirement in December 2017.

As of July 2017, the company's board members were Linda Z. Cook, Nicholas M. Donofrio, Joseph J. Echevarria, Edward P. Garden, Jeffrey A. Goldstein, Gerald L. Hassell, John M. Hinshaw, Edmund F. (Ted) Kelly, John A. Luke Jr., Jennifer Morgan, Mark A. Nordenberg, Elizabeth E. Robinson, Charles W. Scharf and Samuel C. Scott III.

Company culture
In 2008, BNY Mellon formed a Board of Directors corporate social responsibility committee to set sustainability goals. The company's corporate social responsibility activities include philanthropy, social finance in the communities the bank is located in, and protecting financial markets globally.

The bank's philanthropic activities include financial donations and volunteerism. The company matches employee volunteer hours and donations with financial contributions through its Community Partnership program. Between 2010 and 2012, the company and its employees donated approximately $100 million to charity. In 2014, the company worked with the Forbes Fund to create a platform that connects nonprofit organizations with private businesses to solve social challenges.

The company received a 100 A rating in 2013, 2014 and 2015 by the CDP, which measures corporate greenhouse gas emissions and disclosures. BNY Mellon was named on the Dow Jones Sustainability North America Index in 2013, 2014 and 2015, and the World Index in 2014, 2015 and 2016. Another one of the company's focuses has been building efficiency. As of 2014, the company has saved $48 million due to building efficiency. Five of its buildings have achieved Leadership in Energy and Environmental Design (LEED-EB) certification and 23 have interiors that are LEED certified.

The company has business resource groups for employees that are focused on diversity and inclusion. In 2009, Karen Peetz co-founded the BNY Mellon Women's Initiative Network (WIN), a resource group for female employees' professional development. As of 2013, WIN had 50 chapters. Other groups include PRISM for LGBT employees, IMPACT, which serves multicultural employees and HEART for employees with disabilities. The bank has services for returning military, including a tool to help veterans align military skills and training with jobs at the company. In 2014, it was recognized for its diversity practices by the National Business Inclusion Consortium, which named it Financial Services Diversity Corporation of the Year.

In 2009, the company began an innovation program for employees to suggest ideas for large-scale projects and company improvement. Ideas from the initial pilot program generated approximately $165 million in pretax profit. The program results in an annual contest called "ACE" in which teams pitch their ideas.

Controversies and legal issues

Foreign currency exchange issues 
In October 2011, the U.S. Justice Department and New York's attorney general filed civil lawsuits against the Bank of New York, alleging foreign currency fraud. The suits held that the bank deceived pension-fund clients by manipulating the prices assigned to them for foreign currency transactions. Allegedly, the bank selected the day's lowest rates for currency sales and highest rates for purchases, appropriating the difference as corporate profit. The scheme was said to have generated $2 billion for the bank, at the expense of millions of Americans' retirement funds, and to have transpired over more than a decade. Purportedly, the bank would offer secret pricing deals to clients who raised concerns, in order to avoid discovery. Bank of New York defended itself vigorously, maintaining the fraud accusations were "flat out wrong" and warning that as the bank employed 8,700 employees in New York, any damage to the bank would have negative repercussions for the state of New York.

Finally, in March 2015, the company admitted to facts concerning the misrepresentation of foreign exchange pricing and execution. BNY Mellon's alleged misconduct in this area includes representing pricing as best rates to its clients, when in fact they were providing clients with bad prices while retaining larger margins. In addition to dismissing key executives, the company agreed to pay a total of US$714 million to settle related lawsuits.

In May 2015, BNY Mellon agreed to pay $180 million to settle a foreign exchange-related lawsuit.

In May 2016, multiple plaintiffs filed suit against the bank, alleging that the company had breached its fiduciary duty to ERISA plans that held American Depositary Receipts by overcharging retirement plans that invested in foreign securities. In March 2017, the presiding judge declined to dismiss the suit. In December 2017, another lawsuit alleged that BNY Mellon manipulated foreign exchange rates was filed by Sheet Metal Workers' National Pension Fund. BNY Mellon agreed to pay $12.5 million to settle the 2016 lawsuit in December 2018.

Personal data breach 
In February 2008, BNY Mellon suffered a security breach resulting in the loss of personal information when backup tapes containing the personal records of 4.5 million individuals went missing. Social security numbers and bank account information were included in the records. The breach was not reported to the authorities until May 2008, and letters were sent to those affects on May 22, 2008.

In August 2008, the number of affected individuals was raised to 12.5 million, 8 million more than originally thought.

IT system outages 
On Saturday, August 22, 2015, BNY Mellon's SunGard accounting system broke down during a software change. This led to the bank being unable to calculate net asset value (NAV) for 1,200 mutual funds via automated computer system. Between the breakdown and the eventual fix, the bank calculated the values using alternative means, such as manual operation staff. By Wednesday, August 26, the system was still not fully operational. The system was finally operational to regular capacity the following week. As a result of a Massachusetts Securities Division investigation into the company's failure and lack of a backup plan, the company paid $3 million.

In December 2016, another major technology issue caused BNY Mellon to be unable to process payments related to the SWIFT network. As of the time of the issue, the bank processed about 160,000 global payments daily totally an average of $1.6 trillion. The company was unable to process payments for a 19 hours, which led to a backlog of payments and an extension of Fedwire payment services.

Privately owned public space agreement violation 
According to a New York City Comptroller audit in April 2017, BNY Mellon was in violation of a privately owned public space (POPS) agreement for at least 15 years. In constructing the 101 Barclay Street building in Lower Manhattan, BNY Mellon had received a permit allowing modification of height and setback regulations in exchange for providing a lobby accessible to the general public 24 hours a day. Auditors and members of the public had been unable to access or assess the lobby for many years, and were actively prevented from doing so by BNY Mellon security.

In September 2018, the company began to permit public access to a portion of the lobby. However, BNY Mellon remains in violation of its agreement, as the lobby must be accessible to the public 24 hours a day. As of early 2021 the city Comptroller reported that company security personnel prevented auditors from entering or photographing the lobby and was seeking to have the "public lobby" designation removed.

Employment legal issues 
BNY Mellon settled foreign bribery charges with the U.S. Securities and Exchange Commission (SEC) in August 2015 regarding its practice of providing internships to relatives of officials at a Middle Eastern investment fund. The U.S. SEC found the firm in violation of the Foreign Corrupt Practices Act. The case was settled for $14.8 million.

In March 2019, BNY Mellon staff considered legal options after the company banned employees from working from home. In particular, staff cited concerns regarding the impact on childcare, mental health, and diversity. The company reverted the ban as a result of employee outcry.

Other legal issues 
In September 2009, BNY Mellon settled a lawsuit that had been filed against the Bank of New York by the Russian government in May 2007 for money laundering; the original suit claimed $22.5 billion in damages and was settled for $14 million.

In 2011, South Carolina sued BNY Mellon for allegedly failing to adhere to the investment guidelines relating to the state's pension fund. The company settled with the state in June 2013 for $34 million.

In July 2012, BNY Mellon settled a class action lawsuit relating to the collapse of Sigma Finance Corp. The suit alleged that the bank invested and lost cash collateral in medium-term notes. The company settled the lawsuit for $280 million.

In December 2018, BNY Mellon agreed to pay nearly $54 million to settle charges of improper handling of "pre-released" American depositary receipts (ADRs) under investigation of the U.S. Securities and Exchange Commission (SEC). BNY Mellon did not admit or deny the investigation findings but agreed to pay disgorgement of more than $29.3 million, $4.2 million in prejudgment interest and a penalty of $20.5 million.

Recognition and rankings
As of 2015, BNY Mellon was the world's largest custody bank, the sixth-largest investment management firm in the world, and the seventh-largest wealth management firm in the United States. In 2018, BNY Mellon ranked 175 on the Fortune 500 and 250 on the Financial Times Global 500. It was named one of world's 50 Safest Banks by Global Finance in 2013 and 2014, and one of the 20 Most Valuable Banking Brands in 2014 by The Banker.

The bank says it is the longest running bank in the United States, a distinction sometimes disputed by its rivals and some historians. The Bank of North America was chartered in 1781, and was absorbed by a series of other entities until it was acquired by Wells Fargo. Similarly, The Massachusetts Bank went through a series of acquisitions and ended up as part of Bank of America. The Bank of New York remained independent, absorbing other companies, until its merger with Mellon. BNY Mellon is at least the third-oldest bank in the US.

Sponsorships
Since 2012, BNY Mellon has expanded its number of sponsorships. BNY Mellon was the title sponsor of the Oxford and Cambridge Boat Race from 2012 to 2015. The company also sponsors the Head of the Charles Regatta in Boston. In 2013, the company became a 10-year sponsor of the San Francisco 49ers and a founding partner of Levi's Stadium. The company is a regular sponsor of the Royal Academy of Arts in London.

See also

 1 Wall Street
 BNY Mellon Center (disambiguation)
 CIBC Mellon
 Eagle Investment Systems
 Mellon Financial Corporation
 Pershing LLC

Notes

References

Books

External links
 

  Pershing LLC., a subsidiary of The Bank of New York Mellon Corporation
 225th Anniversary Commemorative Video
 iNautix Technologies, a subsidiary of The Bank of New York Mellon
 New York Life Insurance and Trust Company Records at Baker Library Historical Collections, Harvard Business School.

Alexander Hamilton
Companies listed on the New York Stock Exchange
2007 establishments in New York City
Banks based in New York City
Systemically important financial institutions
Companies based in Manhattan
American companies established in 2007
Banks established in 2007
Multinational companies based in New York City
Publicly traded companies based in New York City